Tripneustes is a genus of sea urchins belonging to the family Toxopneustidae.

Species
The genus contains four extant species:

This genus contains many extinct species, such as:

 Tripneustes antiquus Duncan & Sladen, 1855
 Tripneustes californicus Kew, 1920
 Tripneustes gahardensis (Seunes)
 Tripneustes magnificus  Nisiyama, 1966 
 Tripneustes parkinsoni (Agassiz, 1847)
 Tripneustes pregratilla  McNamara and Kendrick 1994
 Tripneustes proavia Duncan & Sladen, 1855
 Tripneustes schneideri Boehm
 Tripneustes tobleri  Jeannet, 1928a

Distribution
These sea urchins have been recorded as fossils from Miocene to Recent (from 15.97 to 0.0 Ma). Fossils have been found in the sediments of Southern Europe, Mediterranean and North Africa, Caribbean, Western coast of America and throughout the Indo-Pacific.

Gallery

References

Toxopneustidae
Echinoidea genera
Extant Miocene first appearances
Taxa named by Louis Agassiz